Innovative Routines International (IRI), Inc. is an American software company first known for bringing mainframe sort merge functionality into open systems. IRI was the first vendor to develop a commercial replacement for the Unix sort command, and combine data transformation and reporting in Unix batch processing environments. In 2007, IRI's coroutine sort ("CoSort") became the first product to collate and convert multi-gigabyte XML and LDIF files, join and lookup across multiple files, and apply role-based data privacy functions (including AES-256 encryption) for fields within sensitive files.

IRI is headquartered in Melbourne, Florida, United States, and has resale and support offices in 25 countries, including France, Japan, South Africa, and Brazil. Primary computing platform partners include HP, IBM, Fujitsu, Intel, Novell, Red Hat, Sun Microsystems, and Microsoft. CoSort users include: AIM Healthcare, EDS, HSBC Insurance, and Thomson Reuters. The company was named a 'Most Promising Big Data Solution Provider' by CIOReview in 2015 as it launched "Voracity" to support Hadoop processing, NoSQL data sources, etc.

Products
IRI software is designed to transform, convert, report, and protect large data volumes rapidly in distributed, heterogeneous computing environments. These functions are built into the CoSort package or through spin-offs for data extraction, generation, security, and migration. Each tool uses the same graphical IDE built on Eclipse, and metadata format for defining and manipulating data. IRI's open data definition file format is also supported by AnalytiX DS and Meta Integration Technology (MITI) so that third-party ETL, BI, and data modeling tool users can convert or re-use their existing metadata in IRI product environments.

IRI CoSort
CoSort was released for CP/M in 1978, DOS in 1980, Unix in the mid-eighties, and Windows in the early nineties, and received a readership award from DMReview magazine in 2000, CoSort was initially designed as a file sorting utility, and added interfaces to replace or convert the sort program parameters used in IBM Infosphere DataStage, Informatica, Micro Focus COBOL, JCL, NATURAL, SAS, and SyncSort Unix.

In 1992, CoSort added related data manipulation functions through a control language interface based on DEC VAX/VMS sort utility syntax, which evolved through the years to handle file-based data integration and staging functions in data warehouse ETL operations:

CoSort Version 9 releases, begun in 2007, can simultaneously transform, convert, report, and/or protect data for ETL, business intelligence, change data capture, database load and query, application development, and data migration activities. Version 10 was released in 2018, adding support for semi-structured, streaming, and cloud data sources.

IRI Voracity
IRI Voracity is a data management platform released in 2016 for data discovery, integration, migration, governance, and analytics. It consolidates key data curation activities in the IRI Workbench GUI (built on Eclipse (software)™), and transforms data in the CoSort engine or optionally in MapReduce, Spark, Spark Stream, Storm, or Tez. Voracity includes most standalone IRI tools, and adds data profiling, ETL, metadata management, master data management, data federation, and multiple job design and control capabilities.

Other tools

IRI CoSort, IRI FACT, IRI NextForm, and IRI RowGen are products in the IRI Data Manager suite. IRI FieldShield, IRI CellShield, and IRI DarkShield are products in the IRI Data Protector suite.

IRI FACT
FACT (FAst ExtraCT) is a high-performance unload utility for Oracle, IBM Db2, Sybase ASE and IQ, SQL Server, MySQL, Altibase, and Tibero. It exports large tables in parallel to flat files for archive, ETL, reorg, reporting and other applications. FACT and CoSort used together "provide for rapid unloading and transformation of data in Oracle databases in support of ETL processes."

IRI NextForm
NextForm is a data migration spin-off from CoSort functionality designed to convert between structured file formats such as CSV, ISAM, LDIF, and XML, plus data types such as ASCII, EBCDIC, Unicode, and Packed Decimal. Newer NextForm editions can structure data in unstructured sources, convert COBOL Vision files, and facilitate database migration and replication.

IRI RowGen
RowGen is designed to generate test data in production table, file, and report formats for prototype database population, compliance, outsourcing, and application prototyping projects. RowGen's GUI parses data models to define table layouts and relationships so database test sets are structurally and referentially correct. RowGen can also transform and format test data during its generation.

IRI FieldShield
FieldShield is a CoSort spin-off designed to protect data privacy in structured and semi-structured data sources. The software protects personally identifiable information and other private data at the field or record level within database tables, files and other sources subject to data spill. Privacy functions include AES encryption, data masking, and pseudonymization. Job details can be audited from a log file in XML format.

IRI CellShield
CellShield is a data discovery and masking product designed for protecting data at the cell level in Microsoft Excel spreadsheets. CellShield comes in Personal and Enterprise editions, with the latter capable of finding and remediating PII in multiple files and sheets in drives and folders accessible on a local area network.

IRI DarkShield
DarkShield is a data discovery and masking product designed for protecting data hidden in so-called dark data, or unstructured file, repositories. DarkShield shares the same data searching, classification, and masking functionality with FieldShield and the CellShield Enterprise Edition in IRI Workbench.

IRI Workbench
The Workbench is a graphical user interface (GUI) and integrated development environment (IDE) for all IRI software products, built on Eclipse™. The Workbench is a free, optional place to design, run, and manage data connections, metadata, and jobs, and to use third-party plug-ins for business intelligence, data modeling, version control, etc.

References

External links
 IRI, Inc. Home Page

Companies based in Brevard County, Florida
Software companies based in Florida
Software companies of the United States